Roger le Wake (fl. 1298) was an English politician.

He was a Member (MP) of the Parliament of England for New Shoreham in 1298.

References

Year of birth unknown
Year of death unknown
English MPs 1298